In Whyte notation, a 4-6-6-4 is a railroad steam locomotive that has four leading wheels followed by six coupled driving wheels, a second set of six driving wheels and four trailing wheels. 4-6-6-4's are commonly known as Challengers.

Other equivalent classifications are:
UIC classification: 2CC2 (also known as German classification and Italian classification)
French classification: 230+032
Turkish classification: 35+35
Swiss classification: 3/5+3/5

The UIC classification is refined to (2'C)C2' for Mallet locomotives.

Challengers were most common in the Union Pacific Railroad, but many other railroads ordered them as well. An expansion for the Union Pacific Challenger class was the Union Pacific Big Boy class, being a 4-8-8-4, instead of a 4-6-6-4.

Today, the only Challenger locomotives that survive were both owned by Union Pacific. One such locomotive, Union Pacific 3985, was operated by the Union Pacific Railroad in excursion service from 1981 to 2010, when mechanical problems took it out of service. It was retired in January 2020 due to its poor mechanical condition and subsequently donated to the Railroading Heritage of Midwest America, where it is now undergoing a second restoration. The second example, Union Pacific 3977 is on static display in Cody Park North Platte, Nebraska.

Though originally intended for freight service, many units could be found leading passenger consists as well. Railroads that used the Challenger type locomotive include:

References

External links
 The Challenger Type Locomotive  
 The Union Pacific Challenger Roster 
 Web Site of ToyTrains1 4-6-6-4 Challenger Steam Locomotives

66,4-6-6-4